Martin Kližan and Philipp Oswald were the defending champions, but Kližan chose not to participate this year. Oswald played alongside Guillermo Durán, but lost in the first round to Rogério Dutra Silva and João Souza.
Juan Sebastián Cabal and Robert Farah won the title, defeating Pablo Carreño Busta and David Marrero in the final, 7–6(7–5), 6–1.

Seeds

Draw

Draw

Qualifying

Seeds

Qualifiers
  Pablo Carreño Busta /  David Marrero

Lucky losers
  Guillermo Durán /  Philipp Oswald

Qualifying draw

References
 Main Draw
 Qualifying Draw

Rio Open - Men's Doubles
Rio
Rio Open